Nguyen Manh Tuong (born June 15, 1960) is a Vietnamese sport shooter. He won a bronze medal for the men's 25 m centre-fire pistol (CFP) at the 2002 Asian Games in Busan, South Korea, with a score of 586 points.

At age forty-four, Nguyen made his official debut for the 2004 Summer Olympics in Athens, where he finished forty-first in the men's 10 m air pistol by one point behind Chinese Taipei's Chang Yi Ning, with a score of 568 points.

At the 2008 Summer Olympics in Beijing, Nguyen competed for the second time in two pistol shooting events. He scored a total of 572 targets in the preliminary rounds of the men's 10 m air pistol, by three points ahead of Ukraine's Ivan Rybovalov from the final attempt, finishing only in thirty-fourth place. Three days later, Nguyen placed thirty-eighth in his second event, 50 m pistol, by two points ahead of Poland's Wojciech Knapik from the final attempt, with a total score of 543 targets.

References

External links
 
NBC 2008 Olympics profile

Vietnamese male sport shooters
Living people
People from Ninh Bình province
Olympic shooters of Vietnam
Shooters at the 2004 Summer Olympics
Shooters at the 2008 Summer Olympics
Asian Games medalists in shooting
1960 births
Shooters at the 1994 Asian Games
Shooters at the 1998 Asian Games
Shooters at the 2002 Asian Games
Shooters at the 2006 Asian Games
Shooters at the 2010 Asian Games
Asian Games bronze medalists for Vietnam
Medalists at the 2002 Asian Games
Southeast Asian Games gold medalists for Vietnam
Southeast Asian Games silver medalists for Vietnam
Southeast Asian Games bronze medalists for Vietnam
Southeast Asian Games medalists in shooting
Medalists at the 2006 Asian Games
Competitors at the 2005 Southeast Asian Games
20th-century Vietnamese people
21st-century Vietnamese people